Hidde Van Beest (born 20 July 1979 in Arnhem, Gelderland) is an Australian volleyball player, who was born in the Netherlands. A Queensland resident, he played college volleyball in the United States, and twice competed for Australia at the Summer Olympics: Sydney 2000 and Athens 2004.

He attended Craigslea State High School, where he excelled in his chosen sport from the outset.

References

 FIVB Profile

1979 births
Living people
Australian men's volleyball players
Volleyball players at the 2000 Summer Olympics
Volleyball players at the 2004 Summer Olympics
Olympic volleyball players of Australia
Sportspeople from Arnhem
Dutch emigrants to Australia
Sportsmen from Queensland